Vũ Thị Nhung (born 9 July 1992) is a Vietnamese footballer who plays as a midfielder for Women's Championship club Hà Nội I and the Vietnam women's national team.

International goals
Scores and results list Vietnam's goal tally first.

References

External links

1992 births
Living people
Women's association football midfielders
Vietnamese women's footballers
Vietnam women's international footballers
Southeast Asian Games gold medalists for Vietnam
Southeast Asian Games medalists in football
Competitors at the 2017 Southeast Asian Games
Southeast Asian Games silver medalists for Vietnam
Competitors at the 2013 Southeast Asian Games
Footballers at the 2014 Asian Games
Asian Games competitors for Vietnam
21st-century Vietnamese women
20th-century Vietnamese women